Sheik Abu Abdul Rahman (Arabic: أبو عبدالرحمن العراقي) (died June 7, 2006), also Sheik Abd-Al-Rahman, was an Iraqi Canadian alleged to have led insurgent forces in "the most disciplined, intense attacks from insurgency forces" in the November 2006 Battle of Turki.

Abu Abdul Rahman moved to Turki in 1995, after marrying a woman from the city.

Abu Abdul Rahman began calling himself al-Iraqi and a "deputy emir" of the insurgency when he posted online stating that the Iraqi mujahideen were entering the "threshold of a new stage in this war." On May 11, 2005 he stated;

Some sources have suggested he led a "Martyrs Brigade" in Iraq, at the request of Abu Musab al-Zarqawi.

Abu Abdur Rahman unwittingly led U.S. intelligence to al-Zarqawi and was killed along with him, on June 7, 2006.

References

Canadian people of Iraqi descent
Year of birth missing
2006 deaths
2006 murders in Iraq
Iraqi al-Qaeda members
Iraqi insurgency (2003–2011)
Deaths by airstrike
People murdered in Iraq
Assassinated al-Qaeda members
Members of al-Qaeda in Iraq
Canadian Islamists
Iraqi Islamists